Trichodermin is a trichothecene.

Trichothecenes
Epoxides
Acetate esters